Michèle Fitoussi (born 24 November 1954) is a French writer. She is of Tunisian-Jewish descent.

Biography
Fitoussi was born in Tunis, Tunisia.

Besides writing fiction and non-fiction, Fitoussi was an editor of French Elle magazine.

She is the co-author, along with Malika Oufkir, of Stolen Lives: Twenty Years in a Desert Jail, an exposé of the Moroccan penal system. She first met Malika Oufkir in March 1997 eight months after Malika had arrived in France from Morocco. Stolen Lives was selected for Oprah's Book Club in 2001.

Fitoussi's novel Victor was adapted into a feature film, released in 2009.

Selected works
Stolen Lives: Twenty Years in a Desert Jail (by Malika Oufkir)
 
Le ras-le-bol des superwomen
Le dernier qui part ferme la maison 
Victor 
Un bonheur effroyable
L'étrangère (by Malika Oufkir)
Des gens qui s'aiment
Cinquante centimètres de tissu propre et sec
Gente que se ama

References
Attention - non of the links below return acceptable results.

1954 births
Living people
Moroccan non-fiction writers
Chevaliers of the Légion d'honneur
French women novelists